A.A. Bere Tallo Airport, previously known as Haliwen Airport  is an airport in Atambua, East Nusa Tenggara, Indonesia.

It changed its name in 2013, to match local government's regulation on airport naming.

History
The airport was a stop-over location in the early days of pioneering aviation for Bill Lancaster and Jessie Maude "Chubbie" Miller in 1927.  This journey was one of the longest flights made in a small aircraft and the first attempted flight between England and Australia.  However, the flight was overtaken by Bert Hinkler, who was the first to complete the journey. 

In 2006, the airport had a runway length of just 900 meters. It was extended several times, with plans to extend the runway to 2,500 meters eventually.

Airlines and destinations

References

Airports in East Nusa Tenggara